Reinstadler is a surname. Notable people with the surname include:

Beate Reinstadler (born 1967), Austrian tennis player
Gernot Reinstadler (1970–1991), Austrian ski racer